Straumsnes is a small village area and church parish in Tingvoll Municipality in Møre og Romsdal county, Norway.  The village was the administrative centre of the old Straumsnes Municipality which existed from 1866 until 1964.  Straumsnes Church is located in the village.

The lake Storvatnet lies just north of the village.

References

Tingvoll
Villages in Møre og Romsdal